Strand (Afrikaans for 'beach') is a seaside resort town in the Western Cape, South Africa. It forms part of the Helderberg region of the City of Cape Town Metropolitan Municipality, situated on the north-eastern edge of False Bay and near the foot of the Helderberg Mountains. Its geographical position is between Somerset West and Gordon's Bay, and is about 50 km southeast of Cape Town City Bowl. Strand has a population of approximately 50,000.  Strand's main attraction is the beach; 5 km of white sandy beach off False Bay.

Strand is often referred to as The Strand (Afrikaans: Die Strand), which is the old name of the town.

The vehicle registration code for Strand is CEY and the postal code for street addresses is 7140.

History
Strand was established as a holiday and fishing resort in 1714. Before being known as Strand, the settlement was known as Mostert's Bay. In 1970, during the Apartheid era, all black, coloured and Asian people were forcefully removed when the town was classified as a white-only resort. Included in the communities forced to leave at this time were the descendants of Cape Malay slaves, who had escaped from Cape Town over 100 years earlier. They lost their homes, but their mosque still stands today.

Strand is administered by the City of Cape Town Metropolitan Municipality. It is in close proximity to the inland town of Somerset West. Recent expansion and development of both towns has resulted in the two now being adjacent to each other, with shopping malls and residential complexes creating the connections. The unofficial divide between the two towns is the national road which bisects them, the N2. Strand forms part of the Helderberg Basin, along with Somerset West and Gordon's Bay.

Strand offers white-sand beaches and views of the Cape Peninsula. During the summer, tourists from other parts of South Africa, including Johannesburg, and abroad, come to enjoy the seaside offerings. Tourism has been a major source of local income since 1950, when the town was popular with visitors from the north of the country, and was home to many retired veterans of the Boer War. There is a train service from Strand to the CBD of Cape Town.

Strand also used to accommodate one of the largest dynamite factories in South Africa, owned by the AECI group. This area is being redeveloped into a large new mixed-use urban development, Paardevlei, and current tenants include Cheetah Outreach.

Tourism
The main beach in the Strand, Melkbaai Beach, is a safe bathing area. Facilities on or nearby this beach include Waterworld with a supertube and mini-golf and Harmony Park which includes a tidal pool. Water sports may be conducted from various points along the beachfront.

Strand has a wide variety of organised sport including a golf course, tennis courts, rugby fields, squash clubs, jukskei, and water sports like surfing, sailing, power boating, paddle skiing and board sailing. The Charles Morkel rugby stadium is home to the Helderberg Rugby Club. "The Pipe" is a part of the beach marked off for surfers and is known for its big waves.

Strand also has an Olympic-sized indoor pool which is centrally heated and is open all year round. The coast between the Lourens River mouth and Gordon's Bay is popular with beach fishermen and rock anglers.

Surfing

Surfing is a popular water sport in Strand, despite the possibility of sharks. These spots are reportedly much easier and safer to surf than other offshore surf spots on the Atlantic Ocean side of the Cape Peninsula, owing to the protection that False Bay offers.

Central business district
The town has a business district attracting customers from the surrounding basin. The CBD offers banks, numerous shopping malls, restaurants, and supermarkets. Friedman & Cohen is the largest single shop in the CBD and serves as a major attraction for residents and visitors. The major shopping malls in the area include the Dorpsmeent Centre, Somerset Mall. The latter is not in the CBD, but outside the town, on the border of Somerset West.

Strand's central business district is entirely surrounded by Strand North and Strand South. Strand Beach Road is divided into three sections - the Golden Mile (also known as Melkbaai) is located between Lourens River and Hibernian Towers (cnr. Beach Road and Sarel Cilliers Road), the central part of Beach Road stretches between Sarel Cilliers Road and the Pavilion complex, whilst the Platinum Mile is located along Blakes Beach and between Odeon Towers and the Ocean View Hotel.

Industry
Strand has its industrial areas, mostly spread along the south side of the N2, including Gants Plaza, Broadlands, and a development near Paardevlei. More recently, Gants Plaza has increasingly been accommodating non-industrial businesses, including the local newspaper, the District Mail / Distrikspos.

In winter there may be a low inversion layer covering the town, resulting in some degree of pollution. This is rarely seen, however, because of the prevalent winds that keep Strand's skies clean.

Education
The town has primary, secondary and tertiary education facilities, and many ECD facilities of varying quality. As of 2007, there are 19 public and private schools.

Primary schools
Dr. G.J. Joubert
Hendrik Louw Primary School
Laerskool Lochnerhof
Loreto Primary School (Strand)
Strand Muslim Primary School

High schools
False Bay High School
Gordon Hoërskool
Hoërskool Strand
Hottentots-Holland
Khanyolwethu Sekondêr
Madrasatyr Rajaa Sekondêr
Rusthof Sekondêr
Simanyene Sekondêr
Strand Sekondêr
Hoërskool Valsbaai
Mills Street Art School
Tertiary institutions
Boland College

List of suburbs

Chris Nissen Park
Die Bos
Goedehoop
Harbour Island
Lourensrivier
Lwandle
Melkbaai
Mostert's Bay
 Rusthof
Strand-Noord
Strandvale
Suider Strand
Twin Palms
 Weltevreden

Coats of arms
The Strand was a municipality from 1897 to 1996.  During that period, it used two coats of arms.

Municipal (1) — The first coat of arms was assumed on 24 February 1927. An anchor was placed behind the shield. The motto was Inspirata floruit.

Municipal (2) — In March 1955, the council approved a new version of the arms, by Ivan Mitford-Barberton.  It registered them with the Cape Provincial Administration in August 1955 and at the Bureau of Heraldry in October 1993.

The new shield of arms was: Per fess, Azure and barry wavy Argent and Azure, on a fess Gules, between in chief a demi-sun issuant and in base a fish naiant, three towers, Or.  In layman's terms, the shield was now divided into three horizontal bands, displaying (1) a golden demi-sun on a blue background, (2) three gold towers on a red background, and (3) a golden fish on a background of wavy silver and blue stripes.  A crest consisting of a red anchor on a golden mural crown was added. The motto remained the same.

Notes

External links

The Strand Website
Photo of busy Strand beach
History, information and pictures
The District Mail, regional newspaper
The Strand Site

Suburbs of Cape Town
Populated places established in 1714
1714 establishments in the Dutch Empire